Olumide Oworu (born December 11, 1994) is a Nigerian actor, model and rapper.

Career
Oworu attended King's College, Lagos , and the University of Lagos. He graduated from Babcock University in June 2017.
Oworu commenced his acting career at the age of six with the television series Everyday People. He is also known for his role of Tari in the Africa Magic Series The Johnsons. He also starred in other television series such as The Patriot, The Men In Her Life, Hammer, Stolen Waters, and New Son. Olumide portrayed the character ‘Weki’ in MTV Base's  Shuga series, seasons 3 and 4. He is also a television presenter. Olumide has won several awards including the "Mr. Popularity" prize in the Model of Africa 2012 contest, the Nollywood Revelation of The Year award at the Scream Awards 2014, and The Most Promising Youth Actor award at Ping Awards 2014. He won the Most Promising actor in the 2015 Best of Nollywood Awards and Best Supporting actor for his role in the Soldier's Story in the 2016 Africa Magic Viewers Choice Awards.

Selected filmography
Everyday people
A Soldier's Story
Shuga
8 Bars and a clefThe JohnsonsThe PatriotStaying strongHammerThe men in her lifeMan of GodFar From Home''

References

1994 births
Living people
Nigerian male models
Nigerian male rappers
Nigerian male film actors
21st-century Nigerian male actors
King's College, Lagos alumni
University of Lagos alumni
Nigerian male television actors
Yoruba actors
Babcock University alumni
Nigerian television presenters
Nigerian television personalities
Nigerian film award winners